Delaware Township is one of the eighteen townships of Delaware County, Ohio, United States. The population at the 2010 census was 2,152.

Geography
Located in the western part of the county, it borders the following townships:
Troy Township - north
Brown Township - northeast
Berlin Township - southeast
Liberty Township - south
Concord Township - southwest
Scioto Township - west
Radnor Township - northwest
Most of Delaware Township is occupied by the city of Delaware, the county seat of Delaware County.

Name and history
Statewide, other Delaware Townships are located in Defiance and Hancock counties.

Government
The township is governed by a three-member board of trustees, who are elected in November of odd-numbered years to a four-year term beginning on the following January 1. Two are elected in the year after the presidential election and one is elected in the year before it. There is also an elected township fiscal officer, who serves a four-year term beginning on April 1 of the year after the election, which is held in November of the year before the presidential election. Vacancies in the fiscal officership or on the board of trustees are filled by the remaining trustees.

Public services
Emergency medical services in Delaware Township are provided by the Delaware County EMS.

References

External links
Township website
County website

Townships in Delaware County, Ohio
Townships in Ohio